Matgoda High School is a Higher secondary school of Bankura district, India.  It was established in 1957.

The school is affiliated to the West Bengal Board of Secondary Education and West Bengal Council of Higher Secondary Education. Students appear for the 10+ examination (Madhyamik) under the former body, and for the 12+ examination (Higher Secondary Examination) under the latter.

Grade 11 and 12 have two streams- Science and Arts.

See also
Education in India
List of schools in India
Education in West Bengal

References

External links 

High schools and secondary schools in West Bengal
Educational institutions established in 1949
1949 establishments in West Bengal